The HyNor-project was a nationally supported project which purpose was to facilitate and coordinate the introduction of hydrogen as a fuel in Norway, running from 2003 to 2012. Toward the commercial introduction of hydrogen vehicles in 2015, the HyNor-project focused on acquiring an early pre-commercial fleet of hydrogen vehicles, and keeping a close dialogue with the leading car manufacturers and other similar initiatives in the Nordic countries and around the world.

History
The HyNor-project started out as a hydrogen highway-project in Norway. It was initiated by large industrial actors such as Statoil and Norsk Hydro in 2003 with the goal of a market-realistic demonstration of hydrogen refuelling stations, as well as hydrogen vehicles. Several hydrogen refuelling stations were built along the  route from Oslo to Stavanger. Norway's first hydrogen fueling station was opened in 2006 near Stavanger, the second in Porsgrunn in 2007, and two stations were opened in Oslo and Lier in 2009. There were also hydrogen stations planned for Bergen and Lyngdal, but these projects were never carried out.

The official opening of the HyNor hydrogen highway -project took place on 11 May 2009 in Oslo, and most of the stations, except for the one in Stavanger are still in operation today. The infrastructure is part of the Scandinavian hydrogen highway partnership.

In October 2011, Statoil announced they wanted to close the hydrogen refuelling stations in Stavanger, Porsgrunn, Drammen and Oslo after 2012. A new company, HyOP, was established to take over the ownership and operation of the stations, and has done so since May 2012.

In June 2012 a new refueling station was opened at Akershus EnergiPark in Skedsmo.

Investment in hydrogen technology has continued. In 2017, Akershus county put aside 19.5 million kronor to invest in continuing the hydrogen bus scheme into 2019.

As at December 2020, IFE's Hynor fuel cell and hydrogen technology test center was located in Kjeller.

Vehicles
The HyNor-project has tested several different hydrogen vehicles:
15 retrofitted Toyota Prius hydrogen internal combustion engine (ICE) vehicles (2007–2012)
4 Mazda RX-8 Hydrogen RE dual fuel hydrogen/gasoline ICE vehicles (2009–2012)
10 Mercedes-Benz B-class F-CELL (2011–2014)
5 Think City hydrogen cars
2 Hyundai ix35 FCEVs

Current station network
 Stavanger - H2 from natural gas reforming (steam reforming), HCNG 8%, at 350 and 700 Bar (shut down in November 2011)
 Porsgrunn - H2 byproduct from chlorine production, 700 bar refueling
 Drammen - Trucked-in hydrogen, 700 bar refueling (shutdown in 2015 and moved to Oslo airport Gardermoen)
Oslo - Trucked-in hydrogen, 700 bar refueling
Oslo - Gaustad - On-site electrolysis (10 Nm3/h), 700 bar refueling
Oslo - Rosenholm - On-site electrolysis (2x60 Nm3/h), 350 bar refueling (bus-only station)
Lillestrøm - H2 from biogas via Sorption Enhanced Steam Methane Reforming(SE-SMR) and solar electrolysis, 700 bar refueling.

See also
Zero Emission Resource Organisation
Scandinavian hydrogen highway partnership
Hydrogen infrastructure
Hydrogen economy

References

Notes

External links
 hynor.no 
 Norwegian Hydrogen Forum
 HYOP

Hydrogen infrastructure
Road transport in Norway